APBR may refer to:
 Association for Professional Basketball Research, an organization that researches the history of basketball and analyzes basketball through objective evidence, especially advanced basketball statistics
 APBR School Gandipalem
 Andrew Phillip Brown (author abbreviation A.P.Br., born 1951), a botanist